Karawatha is an outer southern suburb in the City of Brisbane, Queensland, Australia.

Geography

Karawatha is a sparsely populated suburb with few structures and the majority of the land used as undeveloped park land, known as Karawatha Forest.

History
The naming of the suburb Karawatha originates from an Aboriginal word meaning a place with pine trees.

It was formerly known as Berrinba, but now Berrinba is the name of the suburb to the south within Logan City.

Islamic College of Brisbane opened on 5 January 1995.

Faith Christian School opened in 2012.

Education
Islamic College of Brisbane is a private primary and secondary (Prep-12) school for boys and girls at 45 Acacia Road. It is adjacent to the Karawatha Forest. In 2018, the school had an enrolment of 1,117 students with 86 teachers (82 full-time equivalent) and 31 non-teaching staff (29 full-time equivalent).

Faith Christian School of Distance Education is a private primary and secondary (Prep-12) school at 129 Garfield Road. It offers home-based education within a framework of Christian beliefs. It is operated by Christian Home Based Education Ltd.

Attractions
Karawatha Forest Discovery Centre is in Acacia Road. It is operated by Brisbane City Council.

See also

 List of Brisbane suburbs

References

External links
 ourbrisbane.com website, Karawatha section via Wayback Machine

Suburbs of the City of Brisbane